The Society of Photography Award (「写真の会」賞, Shashin no Kai shō) is an award presented annually since 1989 by the (Tokyo-based) Society of Photography (写真の会, Shashin no Kai) for outstanding work in photography. 

Recipients of the award are not limited to photographers but instead include people, organizations and companies who have helped photography. In many years more than one award is presented.

Winners

1989: Hiroshi Ōshima, Kiyoshi Suzuki, Michio Nakagawa
1990: Seiichi Furuya, Takuma Nakahira, Nobuyoshi Araki
1991: Yutaka Takanashi, Kurō Doi
1992: Nobuyoshi Araki, Isao Hirachi, Kōji Onaka
1993: Hiroh Kikai, Jōtarō Shōji, Kazuhiko Ishii
1994: Yutaka Senoo
1995: Kiyoshi Tanno, Seiichi Motohashi, Itsurō Naraki
1996: Masato Seto, Toppan Printing and others
1997: Kazuhiko Motomura (editor)
1999: Miyako Ishiuchi, Naoyoshi Hikosaka, Kōsai Hori, Ryūji Miyamoto, Masao Mochizuki
2000: Yutaka Kanase, Jun'ichi Ōta, Keiko Harada (editor), Masafumi Sanai
2001: Rika Noguchi, Masaki Hirano
2002: Yoshihiko Seki, Photographers' Gallery, Mariko Terashima
2003: Miyako Ishiuchi, Katsuhito Nakazato
2004: Asako Narahashi, Ken Kitano
2005: Akihiko Hirashima and others
2006: Kensuke Kazama, Yōko Matsui
2007: Seiichi Furuya
2008: Tomoyuki Sakaguchi, Noboru Hama 
2009: Daidō Moriyama, Ichirō Kojima (posthumous) 
2010: Shūji Mizobe
2011: Shunji Dodo, Man Fujita
2012: Yoshiichi Hara, IZU Photo Museum
2013: Taiji Matsue, Jun Abe
2014: Kyoko Uchida, Kei Ono 
2015: Go Itami, Phot street 
2016: Keijiro Kai, Daisuke Yokota

Sources
 Society of Photography. Awards 1989–98.
 Society of Photography. Awards 1999–2007
 Society of Photography. Awards 2008–2009

References

External links

Awards established in 1989
Japanese awards
Photography awards